Perault is an unincorporated community in Red Lake County, in the U.S. state of Minnesota.

History
The community was named for Charles Perrault, an early settler.

References

Unincorporated communities in Red Lake County, Minnesota
Unincorporated communities in Minnesota